Bulanda & Mucha Architects is a Polish studio for architecture with headquarters in Warsaw. The practice is led by its founders Andrzej Bulanda and Włodzimierz Mucha.

It's recognized as one of the most active and most avant-garde architectural firm that designing modern architecture in Poland, and also as one of leading Polish architects.

Its most important design is the BRE Bank building in Bydgoszcz.

References 

Architecture firms of Poland